Robert Teleford Clifford (1835 to July 24, 1873) was a Master-at-Arms in the United States Navy who fought in the American Civil War. He was honored with the award on 31 December 1864.

Biography
Clifford was born in Philadelphia, Pennsylvania, in 1835. He died on 24 July 1873.

Medal of Honor citation

See also

List of American Civil War Medal of Honor recipients: A–F

References

1835 births
1878 deaths
People of Pennsylvania in the American Civil War
Union Navy officers
United States Navy Medal of Honor recipients
American Civil War recipients of the Medal of Honor